is a 1998 racing video game developed by Nextech and published by Takara for the Sega Saturn. It is based on Takara's Choro Q line of pullback racer toys.

Reception

Two reviewers from Sega Saturn Magazine found the game fun to play, with one showing admiration towards its cute graphics and simplicity. Another found its gameplay repetitive and lacking in replay value and innovation. A MANiAC reviewer found the visuals cleaner and higher quality than the Choro Q games on PlayStation, but lamented its new additions and modes for overcomplicating the series' traditionally simple gameplay and being poorly-implemented. Superjuegoss De Lucar said its visuals wouldn't impress plays, but its simplistic gameplay and cute car designs would be appealing towards younger audiences.

Notes

References

1998 video games
Japan-exclusive video games
Racing video games
Sega Saturn games
Sega Saturn-only games
Takara video games
Video games based on Takara Tomy toys
Video games developed in Japan
Multiplayer and single-player video games